The Keys to the White House is a prediction system for determining the outcome of presidential elections in the United States. It was developed by American historian Allan Lichtman and Russian geophysicist Vladimir Keilis-Borok in 1981, adapting prediction methods that Keilis-Borok designed for earthquake prediction. The system is a thirteen-point checklist that concerns the circumstances of a presidential election. When five or fewer items on the checklist are false, the incumbent party candidate is predicted to win the election. Some of the items on this checklist involve qualitative judgment, and therefore the reliability of this system relies heavily on the knowledge and analytical skill of whoever attempts to apply it. Using his own system, Lichtman has correctly predicted the outcomes of all presidential elections from 1984 to 2020, with the exception of the 2000 election.

From the content of the system, Lichtman concludes that voters select the next president mainly on how they feel the incumbent president has governed the country. If the voters are satisfied with the condition of the country, they will re-elect the incumbent president, or whoever from his party runs in his stead. If the voters are dissatisfied, they will transfer the presidency to the rival party. The election campaign has little if any meaningful effect on the voters. Voters are pragmatic and are not swayed by the spectacle of campaigning. Whether the voters are correct to blame the president for the country's specific problems is another matter; the point is that the election campaign is irrelevant. Voters vote retrospectively, not prospectively.

The 13 Keys
The Keys to the White House is a checklist of thirteen true/false statements that pertain to the circumstances surrounding a presidential election. When five or fewer of the following statements are false, the incumbent party candidate is predicted to win the election. When six or more are false, the incumbent party is predicted to lose.

 Midterm gains: After the midterm elections, the incumbent party holds more seats in the U.S. House of Representatives than after the previous midterm elections.
 No primary contest: There is no serious contest for the incumbent party nomination.
 Incumbent seeking re-election: The incumbent party candidate is the sitting president.
 No third party: There is no significant third party or independent campaign.
 Strong short-term economy: The economy is not in recession during the election campaign.
 Strong long-term economy: Real per capita economic growth during the term equals or exceeds mean growth during the previous two terms.
 Major policy change: The incumbent administration effects major changes in national policy.
 No social unrest: There is no sustained social unrest during the term.
 No scandal: The incumbent administration is untainted by major scandal.
 No foreign/military failure: The incumbent administration suffers no major failure in foreign or military affairs.
 Major foreign/military success: The incumbent administration achieves a major success in foreign or military affairs.
 Charismatic incumbent: The incumbent party candidate is charismatic or a national hero.
 Uncharismatic challenger: The challenging party candidate is not charismatic or a national hero.

Overview 
By "incumbent party", Lichtman means the party to which the incumbent president belongs. In the 2016 election, the Democratic Party was the incumbent party because then-President Barack Obama was a Democrat. Obama was in his second term and was thus ineligible for re-election, so Hillary Clinton ran as the incumbent party candidate. Donald Trump was the nominee of the Republican Party and thus the challenging party candidate.

Some of these Keys can be judged using objective metrics, such as economic growth, and some of these Keys are of rather subjective nature, such as candidate charisma. In the latter case, a forecaster must evaluate the circumstances of all past elections together so that his judgments are at least consistent if not objective. He must then observe how his judgments retroactively predict historical election outcomes. If his judgments show no correlation with success or failure, then he must refine his subjective standards until they are predictive of success or failure. Once his subjective standards are so calibrated, the forecaster can then make reliable predictions for future elections.

Key 2 (no primary contest) is true if the incumbent party nominee wins at least two-thirds of the total delegate vote on the first ballot at the nominating convention. Of the 13 Keys, this Key is the single best predictor of an election outcome. Conversely, if there is competition for the challenging party nomination, it does not hurt the challenging party's election chances.

With respect to Key 4, a third party is a political party other than the Democratic Party or the Republican Party. Most American presidential elections since 1860 have effectively been binary contests between Democrats and Republicans, as no third party has come close to winning. If a third party is unusually popular, it signals major discontent with the performance of the incumbent party, and therefore counts against them. Key 4 is turned false when a third party candidate is likely to win 5% or more of the popular vote.

Key 7 (major policy change) is true if the incumbent president redirects the course of government or enacts a major policy change that has broad effects on the country's commerce, welfare, or outlook. It does not matter whether the change is popular with the public, nor does it matter what ideological mold it was cast from. Examples include Abraham Lincoln abolishing slavery and Franklin D. Roosevelt enacting the New Deal. This Key often correlates with other Keys: a president who fails to take vigorous action during a time of national crisis might prolong an economic recession, which in turn could lead to social unrest and his party losing seats in the House of Representatives. One case in point is Herbert Hoover and his handling of the Great Depression.

Key 8 (no social unrest) is turned false when there is widespread violent unrest that is either sustained or leaves critical issues unresolved by the time of the election campaign, which makes the voters worry that the fabric of the nation is coming apart. The civil war of 1861-1865, the racial and anti-war riots of 1968, and the protests of 2020 triggered by the murder of George Floyd were all severe and widespread enough to turn this Key false. The 1992 Los Angeles riots sparked by the beating of Rodney King were too localized to turn this Key false.

Key 9 (no major scandal) is turned false when there is bipartisan recognition of serious impropriety, as the voting public ignores allegations of wrongdoing that appear to be the product of partisan politicking. While the Watergate scandal began during Richard Nixon's first term, it did not affect his re-election bid in 1972 because at the time, the voting public thought the fuss was just a partisan ploy by the Democrats (Nixon was a Republican). After Nixon's re-election, new information about the incident emerged that raised concerns among Republicans as well, and the Watergate affair thus turned into a full-blown scandal that contributed to the Republicans' loss to the Democrats in 1976.

A charismatic candidate, as it pertains to Keys 12 and 13, is a candidate with an extraordinarily persuasive or dynamic personality that gives him or her very broad appeal. Lichtman considers James G. Blaine, William Jennings Bryan, Theodore Roosevelt, Franklin D. Roosevelt, John F. Kennedy, Ronald Reagan and Barack Obama to have been charismatic candidates. Having studied the political careers of all historical presidential candidates, Lichtman found that these seven men had charisma that was exceptional enough to make a measurable difference in their political fortunes. By contrast, Donald Trump had an intense appeal with only a narrow slice of the electorate. It is also possible for candidates to lose charisma: Barack Obama exuded charisma in the 2008 election, but he failed to achieve the same connection with the public in 2012. As for being a "national hero", the candidate must be seen by the public as having played a critical role in the success of some national endeavour. Lichtman considers Ulysses Grant and Dwight Eisenhower to have been national heroes, both great war leaders. Lichtman believes that John Glenn, the third American in space and first to complete an orbit around the Earth, would have qualified as a national hero had he run for President shortly after his spaceflight in 1962.

Lichtman's prediction record
Using the 13 keys, Lichtman has correctly predicted the winner of every American presidential election since 1984 with the exception of the election of 2000.

In 2000, Lichtman predicted that Al Gore would be elected president. As it turned out, Gore won the national popular vote but lost the Electoral College and therefore did not become president. Usually but not necessarily, the winner of the national popular vote also wins the Electoral College, the voting body which actually selects the president. By law, each state awards its Electoral votes to the candidate who wins the local popular vote, and because each state has a different number of votes in the Electoral College, it is possible for a candidate to win the national popular vote yet have fewer Electoral votes than his rival. This is what happened to Gore in 2000, and it had not happened in America since 1888.

In his defense, Lichtman argues that in 2000 he specifically predicted the winner of the national popular vote, which Gore did in fact win. In his 1988 book The Thirteen Keys to the Presidency, Lichtman had indeed defined his model as predicting the outcome of the popular vote. However, he did not remind readers of this nuance in his journal articles wherein he made his prediction for 2000. He simply predicted that Gore would win. Lichtman further argues that Gore was the rightful winner of the 2000 election, and lost because of improper ballot counting in Florida. Had Gore won the popular vote in Florida, he would have received the additional Electoral votes he needed to win the election.

In 2016, Lichtman predicted that Donald Trump would win the election. Donald Trump did indeed become President, but he lost the popular vote. Lichtman says that after the 2000 election, he stopped predicting the outcome of the popular vote and simply predicted the elected president, explaining that discrepancies between the Electoral College and the popular vote had dramatically increased.

Development

While attending a dinner party at Caltech in 1981, Allan Lichtman met Vladimir Keilis-Borok, a leading Russian geophysicist. Both men were Fairchild Scholars at Caltech. Keilis-Borok was interested in applying his prediction techniques to democratic political systems. This was not possible for him to do within the Soviet Union, which was a single-party autocracy, and somebody at the party referred him to Lichtman. Lichtman attracted Keilis-Borok's interest because he was a quantitative historian who mathematically analyzed trends in American history. Lichtman agreed to help Keilis-Borok apply his prediction techniques to American presidential elections.

Lichtman and Keilis-Borok examined data collated from every presidential election from 1860 to 1980 to identify factors that seemed predictive of election outcomes. From his own studies of American presidential elections, Lichtman had come to the conclusion that voters are in fact not much swayed by election campaigns and instead vote according to how well the incumbent president has performed in office. Lichtman also noticed that even if a president did not seek re-election, his failures would taint the prospects of whoever from his own party sought to take his place. These insights shaped how he and Keilis-Borok conducted their research.

Lichtman and Keilis-Borok published their prediction model in a 1981 paper, and at this stage their system had just 12 items. They later expanded it to 13. In 1982, Lichtman made his prediction for the 1984 election.

Theoretical conclusions
Lichtman says that the lesson of 13 keys is that governance, not campaigning, is what determines who will win a presidential election. If voters feel that the country has been governed well for the preceding four years, then they will re-elect the incumbent president or the nominee from the incumbent's party; otherwise, they will transfer the duties of the presidency to the opposition. Given this insight, Lichtman says that candidates should invest less money and effort in their election campaigns since these actually have little effect on the outcome. Likewise, observers should ignore analysts, polls, and media strategists whose careers revolve around the campaign and marketing; Lichtman refers to such people as "hucksters". Sitting presidents should not be afraid in proposing and implementing new policy ideas, because the keys show that voters do not care about specific policies, only the broad results.

As shown by Key 2, the incumbent party should also avoid squabbles over the nominee and instead unite early and clearly behind a consensus nominee; conversely, it is not necessary for the challenging party to do this.

Notes

References

Bibliography
 
 
 
 
 
 
 
 
 
 
 
 

1996 non-fiction books
Books about politics of the United States
Presidential elections in the United States
Books by Allan Lichtman